Planeta U (English: "Planet U"), usually referenced as Tu Planeta U ("Your Planet U") is an American children's programming block that airs on the Spanish language television network Univision, which debuted on September 15, 2001. The three-hour block – which airs Saturday and Sunday mornings from 8:00 a.m. to 11:00 a.m. Eastern Time and Pacific Time – features animated series aimed at children between the ages of 2 and 8.

Programs featured on the block consist almost entirely of Spanish-dubbed versions of series that were originally produced and broadcast in English (with the exception of Pocoyo, which was produced in Spain). All shows featured on Planeta U are designed to meet federally mandated educational programming guidelines defined by the Federal Communications Commission (FCC) via the Children's Television Act.

History
The block's origins stem from a settlement that preceded the FCC's approval of network parent Univision Communications (now TelevisaUnivision)' $12.3 billion acquisition by Broadcasting Media Partners Inc. (a consortium of investment firms led by the Haim Saban-owned Saban Capital Group, TPG Capital, L.P., Providence Equity Partners, Madison Dearborn Partners and Thomas H. Lee Partners). As part of a consent decree in the deal that included the payment of a $24 million fine – the largest single fine levied against any corporation by the FCC at the time – that was issued against Univision in February 2007, following an investigation stemming from complaints filed in 2005 by the United Church of Christ and the National Hispanic Media Coalition during pending license renewal proceedings for two of its owned-and-operated stations (WQHS-TV in Cleveland and KDTV in San Francisco) that uncovered violations of Children's Television Act (CTA) guidelines, which require over-the-air television broadcasters to air a minimum of three hours of compliant educational programming each week, by the network's 24 O&Os. The violations regarded youth-oriented telenovelas from Televisa and Venevision aired by the network (the Televisa-produced Cómplices Al Rescate ("Friends to the Rescue"), ¡Vivan Los Niños! ("Long Live the Children!") and Amy, La Nina De La Mochila Azul ("Amy, the Girl with the Blue Schoolbag"), which were cited due to their questionable educational value and the former's incorporation of occasional adult-themed plotlines and complex subplots that were unsuitable for younger children) that were claimed by the stations as core educational programs in 116 weekly CTA compliance reports filed between 2004 and early 2006.

On April 5, 2008, Univision announced that it would launch a new Saturday morning block featuring live-action and animated series aimed at children between the ages of 2 and 16. Unlike other children's program blocks in existence at the time (and since), the network opted to fully program the block with shows acquired from various programming distributors. Two days later, "Planeta U" debuted, marking the first time that Univision carried an exclusively animated children's program block for younger audiences, having previously carried live action variety-based series alongside half-hour cartoons prior to the shift towards filling its weekend morning schedule with youth-targeted novelas in 2003. The block's initial lineup consisted mainly of Spanish-dubbed versions of American and Canadian children's programs, with Dora the Explorer, Go, Diego, Go!, Pinky Dinky Doo, Jakers! The Adventures of Piggley Winks, Inspector Gadget's Field Trip  and Beakman's World as part of its inaugural lineup.

Additional educational content was included in the form of the interstitial segment Hoy en la Historia ("Today in History"), featuring facts of relevance to historical events, and a series of public service announcements featuring popular Hispanic celebrities (including Juanes, Fanny Lu and Jenni Rivera) sharing focused on ethical and personal safety messages, and environmental conservation tips. "Planeta U" originally aired as a single three-hour, Saturday-only block until September 2008, when the network began airing an hour-long extension on Sunday mornings at 9:00 a.m. Eastern and Pacific Time. The Sunday lineup was discontinued in September 2013, with the remaining Saturday block reverting to three hours.

On June 28, 2014, Walt Disney Television entered into an agreement with Univision in which it launched a new sub-block within the "Planeta U" lineup called "Disney Junior en Univision", featuring dubbed versions of original series from Disney Junior during the first two hours of the block; Mickey Mouse Clubhouse and Handy Manny (the latter's dub incorporated basic instruction of English words and phrases instead of those in Spanish, as the English version features) were the first series to air as part of the sub-block. The sub-block was discontinued on June 23, 2018.

On August 1, 2015, Univision added its first original children's program as part of the block, Sesame Amigos, a half-hour Spanish language version of Sesame Street produced by Sesame Workshop for the network, featuring learning games and educational intersitials similar to those featured on and select characters from the HBO series, with Univision talent and other Hispanic and Latino celebrities making guest appearances during some segments (the network previously aired the Televisa adaptation of its parent series, Plaza Sésamo, from 1995 to 2002, before it was moved to sister network TeleFutura, now UniMás).

Programming
All of the programs aired within the block featured content compliant with educational programming requirements as mandated by the Children's Television Act. Although the Planeta U block regularly aired on Saturday mornings, affiliates in some parts of the country deferred certain programs within the lineup to Sunday morning timeslots to accommodate locally produced programs or due to scheduling issues with regional or network sports broadcasts (such as 2010 FIFA World Cup and 2014 FIFA World Cup soccer tournaments) that start in time periods normally occupied by the block.

Current programming

Former programming

Acquired programming

See also 
 Univision y Los Niños - The Monday to Friday and Saturday morning block on Univision from 1989 to 1990
 La Piñata Loca - The host of George Ortuzar from Saturday and Sunday morning block on Univision from 1996 to 2000.
 Toonturama - The Saturday and Sunday morning cartoon block on UniMás (formerly known as TeleFutura).
 Galamiguitos - The preschool block on Galavisión.

References

Univision original programming
Television programming blocks in the United States
2008 American television series debuts
Preschool education television networks